Arroa is a railway station in Zestoa, Basque Country, Spain. It is owned by Euskal Trenbide Sarea and operated by Euskotren. It lies on the Bilbao-San Sebastián line.

History 
The Zarautz-Deba stretch in which the station is located opened in 1901, as part of the San Sebastián-Elgoibar railway. The Urola railway had a nearby but distinct station of the same name until its closure in 1986.

Services 
The station is served by Euskotren Trena line E1. Trains (in both directions) run every hour throughout the week.

References 

Euskotren Trena stations
Railway stations in Gipuzkoa